Anurag Kashyap is an Indian filmmaker and actor, known for his work in Hindi cinema. After writing a television series Kabhie Kabhie (1997), Kashyap co-wrote Ram Gopal Varma's crime drama Satya (1998). He later wrote and directed a short television film, Last Train to Mahakali (1999), and made his feature film debut with the yet-unreleased film Paanch. He next directed Black Friday (2007), a film on the 1993 Bombay bombings. Its release was barred by India's Censor Board for two years, but was eventually released in 2007 to positive reviews. The same year, he directed the critical and commercial failure No Smoking. Return of Hanuman (2007), an animated film, was Kashyap's next directorial venture. In 2009, he directed Dev.D, a modern-day take on Sarat Chandra Chattopadhyay's Bengali novel Devdas, along with the political drama Gulaal. Despite positive reviews, the latter was a box-office failure.

Kashyap's production company Anurag Kashyap Films released its first film Udaan (2010)—a critical success that earned him the Filmfare Award for Best Story and Best Screenplay. He then directed one of the short films in the anthology film Mumbai Cutting. After directing the thriller That Girl in Yellow Boots (2011), the two-part crime film Gangs of Wasseypur (2012) was his next release, which garnered him the Filmfare Award for Best Dialogue. In 2013, he directed a short film on eve teasing titled That Day After Everyday, and directed one segment of the anthology film Bombay Talkies (2013). In 2013, he co-produced The Lunchbox, a film that was nominated for the BAFTA Award for Best Film Not in the English Language, and the biographical drama Shahid. In 2011, Kashyap started another production company Phantom Films, whose first feature was the period drama Lootera (2013).

Kashyap co-produced and co-edited the comedy-drama Queen (2014), which earned him the Filmfare Award for Best Editing; the film also won the National Film Award for Best Feature Film in Hindi. His next directorial ventures were the thriller Ugly (2014) and the period film Bombay Velvet (2015). The latter opened to mixed reviews from critics and failed to recover its  investment. In 2015, he co-produced two commercially successful films, Hunterrr, NH10 and the critically acclaimed Masaan. Kashyap went on to direct Raman Raghav 2.0 (2016), based on the serial killer Raman Raghav, the sports drama Mukkabaaz (2018) and co-directed India's first Netflix Original series, the crime thriller Sacred Games. In 2019, he co-founded another production company, Good Bad Films, whose first film was Choked (2020).

Films

Feature films

Short films

Documentary films

Television

Footnotes

References

External links
 
 

Indian filmographies
Director filmographies
Male actor filmographies
Anurag Kashyap